The Keller Site is a prehistoric ceremonial center located on a former plantation property in Calhoun County, Arkansas.  It consists of a group of burial mounds that were apparently first established by the Coles Creek culture (c. 500-600AD), and the area also saw use in the Caddoan period, c. 1200AD.  The site was partially excavated in 1909 by Clarence B. Moore.  The site, which was listed on the National Register of Historic Places in 1979, is primarily notable because it is relatively undisturbed, providing the potential for further fruitful research.

See also
National Register of Historic Places listings in Calhoun County, Arkansas

References

Caddoan Mississippian culture
Archaeological sites on the National Register of Historic Places in Arkansas
National Register of Historic Places in Calhoun County, Arkansas
Coles Creek culture
Mounds in Arkansas